Artyom Dmitriyevich Vyatkin (born 5 March 1996) is a Russian football defender.

Club career
He made his debut in the Russian Professional Football League for FC Lokomotiv-2 Moscow on 19 April 2014 in a game against FC Strogino Moscow.

He made his Russian Football National League debut for FC Zenit-2 Saint Petersburg on 20 July 2015 in a game against FC Tosno.

References

External links
 
 
 

1996 births
Sportspeople from Krasnoyarsk Krai
Living people
Russian footballers
Association football defenders
Russia under-21 international footballers
FC Lokomotiv Moscow players
FC Zenit-2 Saint Petersburg players
FC Zenit Saint Petersburg players
NK Novigrad players
FC Lahti players
FC Chayka Peschanokopskoye players
FC Torpedo-BelAZ Zhodino players
Russian First League players
Russian Second League players
First Football League (Croatia) players
Veikkausliiga players
Belarusian Premier League players
Russian expatriate footballers
Expatriate footballers in Croatia
Russian expatriate sportspeople in Croatia
Expatriate footballers in Finland
Russian expatriate sportspeople in Finland
Expatriate footballers in Belarus
Russian expatriate sportspeople in Belarus